Filip Mihaljević (born 14 November 2000) is a Croatian professional footballer who plays as a midfielder for Jarun Zagreb in the Croatian Second Football League.

Career 
Mihaljević began his career with Dinamo Zagreb but was unable to break into the first team and spent time on loan with Hrvatski Dragovoljac, before joining Lokomotiv Plovdiv permanently after his release by Dinamo Zagreb in September 2020.

References

External links
 

2000 births
Living people
People from Sisak
Association football midfielders
Croatian footballers
GNK Dinamo Zagreb II players
NK Hrvatski Dragovoljac players
PFC Lokomotiv Plovdiv players
NK Međimurje players
NK Sesvete players
First Football League (Croatia) players
First Professional Football League (Bulgaria) players
Croatian expatriate footballers
Expatriate footballers in Bulgaria
Croatian expatriate sportspeople in Bulgaria